Linus Rebmann (born 4 April 1947) is a Swiss athlete. He competed in the men's long jump at the 1972 Summer Olympics.

References

1947 births
Living people
Athletes (track and field) at the 1972 Summer Olympics
Swiss male long jumpers
Olympic athletes of Switzerland
Place of birth missing (living people)